is the memorial shrine of Tokugawa Ieyasu in Mito, Ibaraki Prefecture, Japan.

History
The Mito Tōshōgū was established by Tokugawa Yorifusa, the 11th son of Tokugawa Ieyasu and daimyō of Mito Domain in 1621. The shrine originally enshrined Tokugawa Ieyasu in the center, flanked by the Sannō Gongen on the left and Matajin on the right (two protective spirits), and was under the control of a Buddhist temple, Daishō-ji. A chapel to Tokugawa Hidetada was added in 1624 and since then the deified spirits of the successive shoguns have been enshrined at the shrine. The name of the shrine's location was changed to "Tokiwayama" by Tokugawa Mitsukuni in 1699. The 9th daimyō of Mito Domain, Tokugawa Nariaki, in line with the nativist Mito School doctrines promoted by the domain, ordered that the temple be separated from the shrine, and that the Mito Tōshōgū be reformed along purely Shinto lines. This action was cited as one of the reasons for his dismissal from his posts within the shogunate administration and house arrest at Mito. 

In 1875, under the State Shinto system of shrine ranking, the Mito Tōshōgū was officially designated as a "prefectural shrine". The spirit of Tokugawa Nariaki was added in 1936. The Honden of the shrine, which had been designated as an Important Cultural Property since 1917 was destroyed by American bombing in World War II. The Honden was rebuilt in 1962.
Beppyo shrines

See also
Tōshō-gū
List of Tōshō-gū
 List of Shinto shrines

References

External links
   
Tourist website  

Tokugawa clan
Shinto shrines in Ibaraki Prefecture
1621 establishments in Japan
Mito, Ibaraki
Buildings and structures in Japan destroyed during World War II
Tōshō-gū